Rapšys is a Lithuanian surname. Notable people with the surname include:

 Danas Rapšys (born 1995), Lithuanian swimmer
 Ryan Rapsys, American post-hardcore music band member

Lithuanian-language surnames